Bera or Badrivan is a village or gram panchayat in Nauhjhil Block, Mat Tehsil of Mathura district, Uttar Pradesh, India. It situated on Khair-Tentigaon Road. Bera village is about 50 kilometres from Mathura and only 17 kilometres from Khair.

Demography
Bera village was settled in 1300 AD by Jayas Rajputs , with a population of 5000. 

Mostly villagers are dependent on farming. Few are in local business.

Education
The village has an intermediate college: Sri Gandhi Smarak Krishak Inter College Bera donated by Rajputs in Bera and managed by a society.

Schools
 G. S. K. Inter College Bera	
 P. S. Bera-I	
 P. S. Bera-II	
 Saraswati Shishu Mandir	
 Saraswati Shiksha Mandir

Culture
Bera sees heightened activities during the major festival. The Braj culture has been expressed widely through various practices. 
There is a great temple of Shri Alkheswar Mahadev Mandir. The idol of Lord Shiva was found in the pond of Alkheswar in the past. There is very big pond named Alkheswar Kund. A fair is organised in March every year. The temple and pond are all centres of religious activities. From early morning till dusk devoted villagers throng the holy temple.
Rasiya is a tradition that is integral to Braj culture. It is the tradition of folk-songs that describe the love of the divine couple Radha and Krishna. Holi is one of the main festival of this village.
Raaslilas of Mathura have become an integral part of Indian folklore. According to popular belief, Krishna had danced the Raas with gopis on banks of Yamuna river. Surprisingly in the morning people greet each other with Ram-Ram.

Language
The languages spoken in Bera are Hindi and Braj Bhasa.

Politics
Mant (Assembly constituency) is the Vidhan Sabha constituency. Mathura (Lok Sabha constituency) is the parliamentary constituency.

Geography
It has an average elevation of 174 metres (570 feet). Khayara, Chandpur, Mahmudgarhi, Murkati, Badanpur, Lohai, Jarara, Tehra, Jaraara, Jagpura and Sikandarpur are some of the villages that are in proximity.

Transportation
Bera is well connected by road to the rest of Mathura City and Khair City. Yamuna Expressway (From Noida to Agra). The village is served by Upsrtc and private transporters. A direct Roadways bus is available to Mathura and Agra. Private bus is run in every hour from Tentigaon to Khair.

See also
Shri Alkheswar Mahadev Mandir

References

Mathura-The Cultural Heritage. Edited by Doris Meth Srinivasan, published in 1989 by AIIS/Manohar.
Konow, Sten. Editor. 1929. Kharoshthī Inscriptions with Exception of those of Asoka. Corpus Inscriptionum Indicarum, Vol. II, Part I. Reprint: Indological Book House, Varanasi, 1969.
Growse, F. S. 1882. "Mathura A District Memoir"
Drake-Brockman, D. L. 1911. "Muttra A Gaztteer"
Harendra Singh Raghav, Native of Bera Village, Lives in Dubai.

External links
 
 Read details about Mathura

Villages in Mathura district